The Power is the debut studio album by Australian pop singer Vanessa Amorosi. It was released on 3 April 2000 on CBK Produktions and Transistor Music Australia. The album debuted at number 1 on the Australian Albums Chart and was certified 4× platinum by the Australian Recording Industry Association (ARIA). An international version was released with different album art and track listing.

Critical reception

AllMusic editor Brendan Swift called The Power a "solid debut release." He found that the album has her flexing "impressive vocals among a range of standard pop, dance, and rock tracks. Her strong and soulful voice doesn't always sound at home among the more lightweight pop [...] The Power is characterized by consistency rather than standout songs – a glimpse of Vanessa Amorosi's promise, rather than the best of Vanessa Amorosi." Irene Kanaris of Melbourne radio station 3FOX-FM called the album "one of the best" Australian pop album in years. Jodie Prudames from MTV Australia found that The Power was "fresh and shows off her great voice."

Accolades
At the ARIA Music Awards of 2000, the album was nominated for two awards: Highest Selling Album and Breakthrough Release.

Track listing

Charts

Weekly charts

Year-end charts

Decade-end charts

Certifications

Release history

See also
 List of number-one albums of 2000 (Australia)
 List of top 25 albums for 2000 in Australia

References

Vanessa Amorosi albums
2000 debut albums
Pop albums by Australian artists